Manly is an electoral district of the Legislative Assembly in the Australian state of New South Wales, and covers a large portion of the Northern Beaches Council local government area. Created in 1927, although it has historically tended to be a -leaning seat, Manly has had a history of independent local members. It is represented by James Griffin for the Liberal Party, and was previously represented by the former Premier of New South Wales, Mike Baird.

On 23 January 2017, Baird resigned as Premier and member for Manly, triggering a by-election in the district which was held on 8 April and won by Liberal candidate James Griffin.

Members for Manly

Election results

References

External links

Manly
Constituencies established in 1927
Manly, New South Wales
Northern Beaches